General elections were held in Montserrat on 2 March 1961. The result was a victory for the Montserrat Labour Party, which won five of the seven seats in the Legislative Council. MLP leader William Henry Bramble remained Chief Minister.

Background
The elections followed the introduction of a new constitution in 1960, which provided for a ministerial system of government. The number of elected seats in the Legislative Council was increased from five to seven.

Results

Elected MPs

References

Elections in Montserrat
Montserrat
1961 in Montserrat
March 1961 events in North America